Good Mythical Morning is an American comedy web series created by Rhett McLaughlin and Link Neal that first aired on YouTube on January 9, 2012. As of March 3, 2023, the show has 2,340 episodes and counting.

Series overview

Main seasons

Good Mythical Summer

Episodes

Season 1
The first season of Good Mythical Morning; it aired from January 9, 2012 to July 6, 2012.

Season 2
A new animated intro and logo were introduced for this season. The intro was created by Eden Soto and the logo by Kendrick Kidd. The logo would remain in use right up until the start of Season 12 in 2017.

Season 3
During this season, Rhett and Link purchased a new studio building and relocated their company there, as well as hiring new team members. These are introduced in Episode 246. The show was filmed temporarily in the kitchen area of the new studios until the new set was constructed. Rhett and Link also announced the premiere of The Mythical Show which aired on April 25, 2013.

Season 4
This season introduced a brand new set, built within the new studio building that Rhett and Link moved into during Season 3, in the same location that was home to the set used for The Mythical Show which was produced in between Seasons 3 and 4 of Good Mythical Morning. Rhett and Link also used the new wooden desk that had been featured in The Mythical Show. This set would be used right up until episode 596, the last episode of Season 6. This season also introduced a new format called Good Mythical More which serves as a continuation of the main episode. The episodes existed on the main Good Mythical Morning channel alongside the main episodes until they were moved to their separate channel beginning with Season 5.

Season 5
Note: There are four episodes missing from the official playlist. Episodes 418, 475, and 480 are still viewable but are not in the playlist. However, episode 376, "Teaching a Brit Southern Slang W/ Sam Pepper" was taken down and is currently private. However, it is still watchable as a YouTube user not affiliated with the show reuploaded the video to the platform.

Season 6
A new intro sequence was introduced for this season, designed and produced by Los Angeles-based stop-motion production company, Digital Twigs. New specially-composed theme music was introduced too, composed by Pomplamoose, replacing the previously used royalty-free track.

Season 7
This season opens with Rhett and Link in a new studio that Link talks about in the Good Mythical More for episode 597. The set stays the same until episode 1213 when the set undergoes an expansion and is remodified into a bigger set on the opposite side of the studio space.

Season 8

Season 9
Another new intro was introduced for the start of Season 9, again designed by Digital Twigs. Pomplamoose also remixed a new version of the theme music to accompany it.

Season 10

Season 11
Episode 1137 until the end of the season was known as "Good Mythical Summer." Episodes were only released on Mondays, Wednesdays and Fridays. Additionally, the Friday episodes were hosted by other YouTubers or celebrities, with Rhett and Link being completely absent. For these episodes, the hosts are listed below in the "guests" column, as they were considered "guest hosts." These changes were to accommodate the duo's busy schedule working on the second season of their YouTube Red show, Buddy System.

Season 12
A new intro was introduced for Season 12, again designed by Digital Twigs. A new version of the theme music accompanied it, composed by Jeff Zeigler and Sarah Schimeneck.

Starting on November 6, 2017, with episode 1213, Rhett and Link began producing extended episodes of the show in their newly expanded set, split into and uploaded as four separate videos featuring different segments, all of which, when watched together, form one longer episode. The titles listed below for these episodes are the titles of the playlists on the Good Mythical Morning channel that contain the four videos for each episode.

Season 13
Episodes in this season are now only split into three videos, rather than four. A new traffic light system was introduced on the video thumbnails to inform viewers which of the segments to watch in what order, with green being the first segment, yellow the second and red the last.

Good Mythical Summer 2018
As was the case during Season 11 in 2017, Rhett and Link began uploading episodes under the moniker of "Good Mythical Summer." Like the previous occasion, episodes are only uploaded on Mondays, Wednesdays and Fridays, and the Friday episodes are hosted by a celebrity or other YouTube star rather than Rhett and Link themselves (listed in the Guests column below), allowing them to focus on their other projects, particularly their upcoming Tour of Mythicality shows in Australia and North America. Although the episode number count continues to increment with these episodes, they are not officially part of any season, unlike in 2017 when the Summer episodes were considered part of Season 11. Thus, this served as an in-between series until Season 14 premiered on August 20, 2018. Additionally, these Summer episodes revert to the original format of one segment plus the accompanying Good Mythical More, rather than the four and three segment format used for the past two seasons (12 and 13, respectively).

Season 14
This season, the show returned to a one-segment daily episode plus the accompanying Good Mythical More that premiered on August 20, 2018. The change came after some fans disliked the YouTube-funded expansion of the show, which include a multi-segment (four for season 12 and three for season 13) episodes running a total of 22 minutes or longer per day. Meanwhile, this season added a Saturday recap show called "Let's Talk About That," where every week Rhett and Link are joined by their executive producer Stevie to discuss their favorite moments from the week, reveal behind-the-scenes secrets and extra material, and interact with fans and Mythical crew members. This season also added an additional week of episodes (or additional 5 episodes) after their original season finale episode to reminisce fan favorite moments of GMM in 2018. As these additional shows continue to increment the overall number of episodes and still part of Season 14, the date of the season finale listed in the Overview section above this page will be the publish date of the last additional episode, not the original date, in order to avoid confusion.

Season 15
A new intro was introduced for Season 15, designed and animated by Dana Schechter, accompanied by a new theme music composed by Mark Byers.

Good Mythical Summer 2019

Season 16
This season, the show returned with the Saturday show Let's Talk About That with Stevie Wynn Levine, and introduces a new Sunday show New Food with Mythical Chef Josh Scherer. This season also added an additional week of episodes (or additional 5 episodes) after their original season finale episode to reminisce fan favorite moments of GMM in 2019. Unlike last year, the additional videos don't increment the overall number of episodes but is still part of Season 16. Thus, those episodes will not count. Still, the date of the season finale listed in the Overview section above is the publish date of the last additional episode.

Season 17
This season was affected by the COVID-19 pandemic as a result of 'stay at home' orders being enacted in California, where the Mythical headquarters are located. Beginning with episode 56, the release schedule was changed to Mondays, Wednesdays, and Fridays only. This first episode was presented by Rhett and Link separately from their own homes whilst on video call with each other and their executive producer Stevie Wynne Levine. The following episodes were a mixture of content that had already been recorded before the pandemic and so-called 'quarantine episodes' presented from the duo's homes. All episodes taking place in the studio had been recorded weeks prior to the outbreak impacting the United States, with this being clarified in each episode's description.

Beginning with episode 83, episodes began to be recorded in the studio again, albeit with only Rhett and Link and their producer Stevie present, with the rest of the crew working virtually from home. It was stated at the beginning of that episode that the release schedule would continue the three-days-a-week format, but the following week (beginning with episode 86), the release schedule reverted to normal.

Good Mythical Summer 2020
Unlike previous years, Good Mythical Summer episodes in 2020 were uploaded using the regular weekday schedule (as opposed to just Mondays, Wednesdays and Fridays), and Rhett and Link hosted every episode (whereas previous years had guest hosts for the Friday shows). The gap between the end of the season and the start of the Summer episodes was also a lot shorter as Season 17 ran longer than usual due to its reduced uploading schedule (see above).

Season 18
This season brought in the series' seventh intro sequence, but at the same time, temporarily replaced the "let's talk about that" phrase at the beginning of each episode with a teaser scene; this was later dropped and the phrase was reinstated with episode 36. On November 19, 2020, an all-day live stream was shown instead of a normal GMM episode.

Season 19

Good Mythical Summer 2021
Episodes during Good Mythical Summer 2021 are being uploaded on Mondays, Wednesdays, and Fridays, as was done during the summer seasons in 2018 and 2019. The show's second annual all-day livestream was held on September 2, 2021, benefiting Save the Children.

Season 20
The twentieth season of Good Mythical Morning; it premiered on September 13, 2021 and ended on December 17, 2021. The first week of the new season was marked as the "Week of Mega-cality", and the special Top 5 episodes at the end of the season were uploaded on Monday, Wednesday, and Friday over a 2-week period, as opposed to 1 week of 5 episodes in previous seasons.

Season 21
In this season of Good Mythical Morning, Rhett and Link celebrate 10 years of the show - the first week of the season was called the "10 years of GMM celebration week". The season premiere aired on January 10, which is 10 years and 1 day after the first episode of Good Mythical Morning aired. This season also brought in the series' eighth intro sequence.

Good Mythical Summer 2022

Season 22

Season 23
The twenty-third season of Good Mythical Morning; it premiered on January 9, 2023 and is the current season of the show. The official and most up to date list of episodes can be found in the season's YouTube playlist.

Footnotes

References

External links 

Good Mythical Morning